Nosa is an antlion genus in the tribe Palparini.

References

External links 

Myrmeleontidae genera
Myrmeleontidae